There have been three baronetcies created for persons with the surname Croft, one in the Baronetage of England and two in the Baronetage of the United Kingdom. All three creations are extant as of 2008.

The Croft Baronetcy, of Croft Castle in the County of Hereford, was created in the Baronetage of England on 18 November 1671 for Herbert Croft, who later represented Herefordshire in Parliament. He was a member of a prominent Herefordshire family of Norman descent. The second Baronet sat as Member of Parliament for Leominster, Winchelsea and Bere Alston. The fifth Baronet was an author. The ninth Baronet represented Herefordshire in the House of Commons. The former seat of the family was Croft Castle in Herefordshire.

The Croft Baronetcy, of Cowling Hall in the County of York, was created in the Baronetage of the United Kingdom on 17 December 1818 for John Croft, in honour of his services during the Peninsular War. He shared a common ancestry with the Croft Baronets of Croft Castle.

The Croft Baronetcy, of Bournemouth in the County of Southampton was created in the Baronetage of the United Kingdom on 28 February 1924 for Henry Croft. He was the grandson of Reverend Richard Croft, third son of the sixth Baronet of the 1671 creation. In 1940 he was elevated to the peerage as Baron Croft. For more information on this creation, see this title.

Croft baronets, of Croft Castle (1671)
Sir Herbert Croft, 1st Baronet (–1720)
Sir Archer Croft, 2nd Baronet (1684–1753)
Sir Archer Croft, 3rd Baronet (1731–1792)
Sir John Croft, 4th Baronet (c. 1735–1797)
Sir Herbert Croft, 5th Baronet (1751–1816)
Dr. Sir Richard Croft, 6th Baronet (1762–1818)
Sir Thomas Elmsley Croft, 7th Baronet (1798–1835)
Sir Archer Denman Croft, 8th Baronet (1801–1865)
Sir Herbert George Denman Croft, 9th Baronet (1838–1902)
Sir Herbert Archer Croft, 10th Baronet (1868–1915)
Sir James Herbert Croft, 11th Baronet (1907–1941)
Sir Hugh Matthew Fiennes Croft, 12th Baronet (1874–1954)
Sir Bernard Hugh Denman Croft, 13th Baronet (1903–1984)
Sir Owen Glendower Croft, 14th Baronet (born 1932)

The heir apparent to the baronetcy is Thomas Jasper Croft (born 1962), only son of the 14th Baronet.

Croft baronets, of Cowling Hall (1818)
Sir John Croft, 1st Baronet (died 1862)
Sir John Frederick Croft, 2nd Baronet (1828–1904)
Sir Frederick Leigh Croft, 3rd Baronet (1860–1930)
Sir John William Graham Croft, 4th Baronet (1910–1979)
Sir John Archibald Radcliffe Croft, 5th Baronet (1910–1990)
Sir Thomas Stephen Hutton Croft, 6th Baronet (born 1959)

Croft baronets, of Bournemouth (1924)
see the Baron Croft

References
Kidd, Charles, Williamson, David (editors). Debrett's Peerage and Baronetage (1990 edition). New York: St Martin's Press, 1990.

Citations

Croft
1671 establishments in England
1818 establishments in the United Kingdom
Croft